Penumudi is a village in Guntur district of the Indian state of Andhra Pradesh. It is located on the banks of Krishna river, in Repalle mandal of Tenali revenue division.

Geography 

Demographics 

 census, Penumudi had a population of 3,534 with 1,044 households. The total population constitute, 1,752 males and 1,782 females —a sex ratio of 1017 females per 1000 males. 316 children are in the age group of 0–6 years, of which 170 are boys and 146 are girls. The average literacy rate stands at 63.05% with 2,029 literates, lower than the state average of 67.41%.

Transportation 

National Highway 216 (India) passes through this penumudi village. It is a main and major Spur road of National Highway 16 (India).  This road connects Ongole and Kathipudi . This Highway is called Coastal Highway of andhrapradesh.

Governance 

Penumudi gram panchayat is the local self-government of the village. It is divided into wards and each ward is represented by a ward member. The elected members of the gram panchayat is headed by a sarpanch.

Economy 
Agriculture and Aquaculture are the main occupations of the villagers. Paddy and black gram and corn are the major crops cultivated. While, prawns are the main source of income in aquaculture.

See also 
List of villages in Guntur district

References

External links 

Villages in Guntur district